Insteon  was an Irvine, California, United States, based developer of home automation (aka domotics) hardware and software.  The technology, also called Insteon, allows light switches, lights, thermostats, motion sensors, and other electrical devices to interoperate through power lines, radio frequency (RF) communications, or both.  The company produced over 200 products featuring the technology.
Insteon is a subsidiary of Smartlabs, Inc., also based in Irvine, CA.
As of April 15 2022, there are reports that Insteon has shut down its servers and closed. 
As of June 9 2022, a group of Insteon users acquired the company and committed to rebuild the business.

History
Insteon was founded in 2005 in Irvine, California, by CEO Joe Dada.  Dada had previously founded Smarthome in 1992, a home automation product catalog company, and operator of the Smarthome.com e-commerce site.  In the late 1990s, Dada acquired two product engineering firms which undertook extensive product development efforts to create networking technology based on both power-line and RF communications.  In 2004, the company filed for patent protection for the resultant technology, called Insteon, and it was released in 2005.  In 2012, the company released the first network-controlled light bulb using Insteon-enabled technology, and at that point Dada spun Insteon off from Smarthome.

Technology

Insteon technology uses a dual-mesh networking topology in which all devices are peers and each device independently transmits, receives, and repeats messages.

Products
Insteon produced over 200 products using its technology, including LED bulbs, wall switches, wall keypads, sensors, thermostats, plug in modules and embedded devices, along with central controllers for system management.

Insteon markets two different central controllers: its own brand, called the Insteon Hub, and a newer HomeKit-enabled Insteon Hub Pro designed for Apple HomeKit compatibility. In 2012, the company introduced the first network-controlled LED light bulb.

References

External links

Smart home hubs
Wireless sensor network
Mesh networking
IOS software
Android (operating system) software
Windows Phone software
Power-line communication Internet access
Home automation companies